Tenth Ward may refer to:

10th Ward of New Orleans, a ward of New Orleans
Tenth Ward Square, a historic district in Salt Lake City
Ward 10, St. Louis City, an aldermanic ward of St. Louis
Ward 10, the name of several wards of Zimbabwe
Gloucester-Southgate Ward, Ottawa (also known as Ward 10)